Estonia competed at the 2015 European Games, in Baku, Azerbaijan from 12 to 28 June 2015.

Estonia sent 59 competitors, while the total delegation was 97.

Medalists

Competitors 
Estonia is represented by 59 athletes in 12 sports.

Archery

Badminton

Basketball

Martin Dorbek
Renato Lindmets
Ardi Oja
Siim Raudla

Boxing

Kaupo Arro
Andrei Hartšenko
Ainar Karlson
Rain Karlson

Cycling

Ketlin Tekkel
Martin Laas
Aksel Nõmmela
Risto Raid
Liisi Rist
Mihkel Räim
Martin Loo
Maaris Meier

Fencing

Julia Beljajeva
Irina Embrich
Erika Kirpu
Katrina Lehis
Nikolai Novosjolov

Judo

Iljas Avir
Aleksandr Marmeljuk
Juhan Mettis
Grigori Minaškin
Künter Rothberg
Jevgeni Salejev
Kristjan Tõniste

Shooting

Meelis Kiisk
Peeter Olesk
Veera Rumjantseva
Anžela Voronova

Swimming

Maksim Akavantsev
Kertu Ly Alnek
Andrei Gussev
Silver Hein
Werner-Erich Kulla
Margaret Markvardt
Karel Seli
Cevin Anders Siim
Daniel Zaitsev
Nikita Tšernõšev

Triathlon

Aleksandr Latin
Kaidi Kivioja

Volleyball

Kristo Kollo
Rivo Vesik

Wrestling

Eerik Aps
Ardo Arusaar
Heiki Nabi
Silver Tõgen
Aleksei Baskakov
Ragnar Kaasik
Epp Mäe

References

Nations at the 2015 European Games
European Games
2015